Don Hineman (born May 27, 1947) is a Republican member of the Kansas House of Representatives, representing the 118th district. He has served since 2009. He was the Majority leader from 2017 to 2019.

Don is the older brother of Linda Gallagher who had served in the House since 2015 through 2019. Don was the Majority Leader in 2017–2018. They are both moderate Republicans. Their father, Kalo Hineman, also served in the Kansas House from 1975 until he was appointed to the Commodity Futures Trading Commission by Ronald Reagan in mid-term, 1981.

Prior to being elected to the House, Hineman served as a Lane County Commissioner for 16 years, and was a member of the Dighton City Council for 3½ years.

He has been president of the Kansas Livestock Association, chairman of the Kansas Alliance for Education, and sat on the board of the National Cattlemen's Beef Association.

Hineman is married to Betsy Hineman.

Committee membership
Education
Vision 2020
Veterans, Military and Homeland Security
Agriculture and Natural Resources

Major donors
The top five donors to Hineman's 2008 campaign:
1. Kansas Republican Party - $1,500
2. Kansas Contractors Assoc. - $500
3. Campbell, Loren & Amber - $500
4. Pioneer Inc. $500
5. Stanley, Ellen May $500

References

External links
Official website
Kansas Legislature - Don Hineman
Project Vote Smart profile
Kansas Votes profile
 Campaign contributions: 2008

1947 births
21st-century American politicians
County commissioners in Kansas
Living people
Republican Party members of the Kansas House of Representatives
Ross School of Business alumni